Vassa Zheleznova or The Mistress is a 1953 Soviet drama film directed by Leonid Lukov and starring Vera Pashennaya, Mikhail Zharov and Nikolai Shamin. It is based on Maxim Gorky's 1910 play Vassa Zheleznova. Lukov also directed another Gorky adaptation Barbarians the same year.

Cast
   Vera Pashennaya as Vassa Zheleznova  
 Mikhail Zharov as Prokhor Khrapov  
 Nikolai Shamin as Sergei Zheleznov  
 Valentina Yevstratova as Natalya  
 Yekaterina Yelanskaya as Lyudmila  
 Elizaveta Solodova as Rashel  
 Varvara Obukhova as Secretary Anna Onoshenkova  
 Leonid Titov
 Prov Sadovsky as Yevgeni Melnikov  
 Konstantin Svetlov 
 Gennadiy Sergeev 
 Aleksandra Antonova as Maid Liza  
 Elena Kuznetsova as Maid Polya

References

Bibliography 
 Rollberg, Peter. Historical Dictionary of Russian and Soviet Cinema. Scarecrow Press, 2008.

External links 
 

1953 films
1953 drama films
Soviet drama films
1950s Russian-language films
Films based on works by Maxim Gorky
Films directed by Leonid Lukov
Films set in Nizhny Novgorod
Films set in the Russian Empire